Marshall Pickney Wilder (September 22, 1798 –  December 16, 1886) was a Massachusetts merchant, amateur horticulturalist, and politician who served in the Massachusetts House of Representatives, on the Massachusetts Governor's Council as a member and President of, the Massachusetts Senate.

As a pomologist he was founder (1848) and longtime president of the American Pomological Society.

See also
 71st Massachusetts General Court (1850)

References

External links
 Marshall P. Wilder collection at the University of Massachusetts Archives.

1798 births
Massachusetts Whigs
19th-century American politicians
Members of the Massachusetts House of Representatives
Members of the Massachusetts Governor's Council
Massachusetts state senators
Presidents of the Massachusetts Senate
1886 deaths
Pomologists
People from Rindge, New Hampshire